Royal Air Force Goxhill or RAF Goxhill is a former Royal Air Force station located east of Goxhill, on the south bank of the Humber Estuary, opposite the city of Kingston upon Hull, in north Lincolnshire, England.

Origins
During the First World War a Royal Flying Corps landing ground existed near the Lincolnshire village of Goxhill.  In 1940 the Air Ministry returned to survey the land once again for its suitability as an airfield.

Royal Air Force use

Goxhill was originally used as a barrage balloon site to protect the port of Hull and the River Humber.

In 1940, Goxhill was transferred to RAF Bomber Command and was planned and rebuilt as a bomber airfield. Three hangars were built: two T-2s, one J-Type and four blisters and fifty aircraft hardstands. Temporary accommodation was provided for 1700+ personnel.

Its location, however, was too close to the air defences of Hull to be used for that purpose. Its first occupant was No. 1 Group, which took up residence on 26 June 1941. Its mission was towing practice targets with Westland Lysanders; its first operation began on 25 October.

In December 1941, RAF Fighter Command replaced the Bomber Command training unit with No. 12 Group, flying Supermarine Spitfires from No. 616 Squadron at RAF Kirton in Lindsey. Fighter Command operated the base until May 1942.

United States Army Air Forces use

The airfield was relegated to satellite field use by RAF Kirmington until August 1942, when it was taken over by the United States Army Air Forces (USAAF). The transfer ceremony was attended by General Dwight D. Eisenhower. During the war it was known as USAAF Station 345.

The facilities at Goxhill, however, left a lot to be desired. Three wooden barracks were supplemented by a number of metal fabricated buildings for living quarters.  Typical of the temporary RAF station of that period, living quarters and mess facilities were 1 to 2 miles from the hangars and flight operations area for safety reasons.

The station was unofficially known by the USAAF units based here as "GoatHill". The USAAF used Goxhill as a training airfield for the rest of the war; several squadrons used it after their initial deployment to the UK, then moved on to a permanent facility for their operational missions.

USAAF Station Units assigned to RAF Goxhill were:
 333rd Service Group
 332rd Service Squadron; HHS 333d Service Group
 13th Station Complement Squadron
 18th Weather Squadron
 2nd Gunnery & Tow Target Flight
 1004th Signal Company
 1148th Quartermaster Company
 1275th Military Police Company
 1771st Ordnance Supply & Maintenance Company
 2130th Engineer Fire Fighting Platoon

Both the USAAF 8th and 9th Air Force used Goxhill. Units which trained here were:

The 496th Fighter Group was a Combat Crew Replacement Center for 8th and 9th USAAF units. It consisted of the 554th Fighter Squadron with P-38s and the 555th Fighter Squadron with North American P-51 Mustangs. The group trained over 2,400 fighter pilots during its existence. The 78th Fighter Group came to England equipped with P-38s, but had all of its aircraft and most of its pilots sent to the Twelfth Air Force in February 1943, after which it flew P-47 Thunderbolts.

Post-war military use
On 20 January 1945, the USAAF returned Goxhill to RAF control, and it was assigned as a satellite to RAF Kirton In Lindsey.  On 27 May 1945 it was assigned to RAF Maintenance Command for storage of excess munitions. RAF Goxhill remained a storage depot until it was deactivated on 14 December 1953.

Goxhill airfield was leased to farmers for agricultural use until 29 January 1962, when it was finally sold by the Ministry of Defence (MoD).  The technical site and the hangars, however, were retained by the MoD for storage. In July 1977, the MoD sold off the remaining parts of Goxhill to private owners for agricultural use.

Agricultural use

Since the end of its military use, Goxhill airfield has remained remarkably intact, with a Mary Celeste feel about it. Perhaps because of its relative inaccessibility, Goxhill still looks very much as it did during the war years. All the buildings on the technical site, except the control tower which was partly demolished (despite the owner's objection) in 2002, are still standing. The three hangars—two T.2s and a J type—are also there, albeit in a state of disrepair. The perimeter track is almost complete, and a large part of the main runway is still in place. In the northwest corner of the site is a memorial incorporating a propeller blade from a crashed P-38. The remains of the control tower were acquired by the Military Aviation Museum in Pungo, Virginia, USA, and after careful dis-assembly and cataloging, the components were shipped to America, where the tower has been reconstructed for use by the museum.

See also

List of former Royal Air Force stations

References

Citations

Bibliography

 Bruce Barrymore Halpenny Action Stations: Wartime Military Airfields of Lincolnshire and the East Midlands v. 2

 Freeman, Roger A., Airfields Of The Eighth, Then And Now, 1978
 Maurer Maurer, Air Force Combat Units Of World War II, Office of Air Force History, 1983
 Parker, Ron Goxhill At War, 1994
 Parker, Ron A Village At War Goxhill, 1996
 USAAS-USAAC-USAAF-USAF Aircraft Serial Numbers--1908 to present

External links

 496th Fighter Training Group History—This opens up a pdf file and not a web page. (i.e. html)
 United States Army Air Forces - Goxhill
 Historic Goxhill photo.htm
 RAF Goxhill North Lincolnshire Airfield

Royal Air Force stations in Lincolnshire
Airfields of the VIII Fighter Command in the United Kingdom
Royal Flying Corps airfields
Royal Air Force stations of World War II in the United Kingdom